Gregers Birgersson (died January 15, 1276) Greger/Gregory/Gregorius was a Swedish knight, a major landowner and an illegitimate son of Birger Jarl of the House of Bjelbo (also known as the House of Folkung). He was born out of wedlock by an unknown woman. He was the grandson of Magnus Minnesköld and Ingrid Ylva.

The proof that Birger Jarl had an illegitimate son, "Gregory" (i.e., Gregers) is in the record of his death (1276) found by the Danish 1600-century historian Otto Sperling excerpts from the transcript are also confirmed by a charter March 27, 1272, issued by the "G quondam ducis
Filius".

His death was recorded on January 15, 1276, he was buried in Minoriterna, a Franciscan monastery in Uppsala. Very little remains of the monastery, apparently it has been partially excavated and several graves were found.

He was a landowner in Bathing in North Yorkshire and the Arnön in Uppland and he was married to an unknown woman who owned an estate in Södermanland.

He is regarded in history as the father of the clan called “Bjälboättens oäkta gren” (the illegitimate branch of the House of Bjelbo).

Children 
 Knut Gregersson
 Jon Gregersson
 Magnus Gregersson
 Karl Gregersson
 NN Gregersdotter, married Filip Ingevaldsson (Örnsparre)
 NN Gregersdatter possibly the mother of Mats Kettil Mundsson

Year of birth missing
1276 deaths
Swedish nobility
House of Bjelbo